Anu Irmeli Palevaara (born 14 August 1971 in Helsinki) is a Finnish actress, choreographer and dancer. She is best known for her role as Jenni Vainio in the Finnish soap opera Salatut elämät which airs on MTV3. Palevaara has been with the series from the beginning, but in year 2001 she had a child and left for maternity leave. Palevaara's pregnancy was written in the series so that her character Jenni had a child. Palevaara returned to the series after her maternity leave. Palevaara's character Jenni was killed off in 2013.

Anu Palevaara studied dance, drama and singing in the Laine Theatre Arts - music theater school in England 1990–1994. Palevaara has made choreographies for the municipal theatre of Lahti and to Hot Club Company, to name a few. She also starred as the leading woman in the successful Finnish movie  Kuningasjätkä 1998 directed by Markku Pölönen as well as in the TV series Iskelmäprinssi. In 1998 she hosted Tangomarkkinat with Heikki Hietamies.

Movies 
 Kuningasjätkä (Hilkka Mäkelä, 1997)
 Johtaja Uuno Turhapuro - pisnismies (Rosa, daughter of the leaderess of cooperative store, 1998)
 Rendel (A whore, 2017)

TV-series 
 Iskelmäprinssi - Anita (1998–1999)
 Torvensoittaja katolla revyy (1998)
 Salatut elämät - Jenni Vainio (1999–2001, 2002–2011 and 2012–2013)

References

20th-century Finnish actresses
Finnish choreographers
1971 births
Living people
Actresses from Helsinki
21st-century Finnish actresses
Finnish film actresses
Finnish television actresses
Finnish soap opera actresses